USS Kalamazoo (AOR-6) was a   commissioned by the United States Navy in 1973. She continued to support Navy requirements until 1996 when she was placed in the reserve fleet and later struck.

Construction
Kalamazoo was laid down on 1 October 1970 and launched on 1 November 1972 at the shipyard of the General Dynamics Corporation, Quincy, Massachusetts. On 11 August 1973 she was commissioned USS Kalamazoo (AOR-6) and placed into service for the fleet. Her first homeport was Mayport Naval Station, Mayport, Florida.

Service history

Decommissioning
On 16 August 1996 Kalamazoo was decommissioned and placed in reserve at the National Defense Reserve Fleet, James River, Lee Hall, Virginia. She was struck from the Navy Directory on 29 October 1998 and, on 15 July 2008, she was sold by the U.S. Maritime Administration to Esco Marine, Brownsville, Texas, for $1,465,726.  Kalamazoo was towed out of James River Reserve Fleet on Tuesday, 30 September 2008, en route to ESCO Brownsville.

Honors and awards
Qualified Kalamazoo personnel were authorized the following:
 Joint Meritorious Unit Award
 Navy Unit Commendation
 Navy Meritorious Unit Commendation
 Navy Battle "E" Ribbon (2)
 Navy Expeditionary Medal (1-Iran/Indian Ocean, 5-Lebanon) 
 National Defense Service Medal with star
 Southwest Asia Service Medal with three stars

See also
 United States Navy
 Replenishment oiler

References

 

 

Wichita-class replenishment oilers
Cold War auxiliary ships of the United States
Ships built in Quincy, Massachusetts
1972 ships